The moonfish of the genus Mene, the sole extant genus of the family Menidae, are disk-shaped fish which bear a vague resemblance to gourami, thanks to their thread-like pelvic fins.  Today, the genus is represented only by Mene maculata of the Indo-Pacific, where it is a popular food fish, especially in the Philippines, where it is known as bilong-bilong, chabita, hiwas or tahas.
 
As a genus, Mene has a long fossil history, with species found in marine sediments throughout the Cenozoic Era. The earliest accepted species, M. purdyi from the Paleocene of Peru, resemble later species, such as M. rhombea of the Monte Bolca lagerstätte, and even the living species, M. maculata. Experts remain undecided whether the Tunisian species, M. phosphatica is from the Lower Paleocene, thus making it older than M. purdyi, or whether it is from the Ypresian epoch of the Eocene. Almost all of the species are known primarily from the Paleogene; the Neogene record is rather sparse, if not totally nonexistent, with some otoliths found in Miocene strata, and no whole or even partial specimens known from Pliocene or Pleistocene strata.

Anatomical and recent molecular studies strongly suggest a relationship with the pomfrets, dolphinfishes, remoras and the jacks in the order Carangiformes.

Gallery

Timeline

References

External links
"A new species of Mene (Perciformes: Menidae) from the Paleocene of South America, with notes on paleoenvironment and a brief review of menid fishes."

Menidae
Carangiformes
Paleocene fish
Eocene fish
Oligocene fish
Miocene fish
Prehistoric fish of Africa
Paleogene fish of Asia
Cenozoic fish of Europe
Prehistoric fish of South America
Extant Thanetian first appearances
Thanetian genera
Ypresian genera
Lutetian genera
Bartonian genera
Priabonian genera
Rupelian genera
Chattian genera
Aquitanian genera
Burdigalian genera
Langhian genera
Serravallian genera
Tortonian genera
Messinian genera
Holocene genera
Fish genera with one living species